The Better Half VW is an American aircraft engine, designed by Leonard Milholland of Brookshire, Texas, in 1993 for use in ultralight aircraft. The engine is supplied in the form of plans for amateur construction.

Design and development
The engine is a twin cylinder four-stroke, horizontally-opposed air-cooled, direct-drive gasoline engine design based on the Volkswagen air-cooled engine. Unlike other half VWs this design does not require cutting the engine block in half, but instead blanks the two aft cylinders and removes the pistons.

The design has evolved over time, incorporating improvements to reduce complexity and improve reliability.

Applications
Milholland Legal Eagle

Specifications (Better Half VW)

See also

References

External links

Air-cooled aircraft piston engines
1990s aircraft piston engines